Pennant is a village in the Canadian province of Saskatchewan within the Rural Municipality of Riverside No. 168 and Census Division No. 8.

History 
Pennant incorporated as a village on July 29, 1912.

Climate

Demographics 

See also 
 List of communities in Saskatchewan
 Villages of Saskatchewan

Footnotes

Villages in Saskatchewan
Riverside No. 168, Saskatchewan
Division No. 8, Saskatchewan